Philip James Roberts (born 7 April 1994) is an Irish footballer who last played for Farnham Town. He began his career at Arsenal, although he never made an appearance for the club. He spent time on loan at Inverness Caledonian Thistle, then signed for Falkirk. He signed for Dundee in the summer of 2014 and spent the second half of the 2014–15 season on loan at Alloa Athletic.

Early life
Born in the London Borough of Newham, Roberts attended Ilford County High School in Barkingside, Ilford from the years of 11–16. He has a sister called Lauren – attending Woodford County, and a younger brother called Chris. His cousin, Sean Roberts is a semi-professional footballer who has played for North Greenford Utd, Thamesmead Town, VCD Athletic A.F.C. Hornchurch, and is who plays for Cray Wanderers, Philip played at youth levels for Charlton before being released, having been on trial at Liverpool he eventually ended up playing for Norwich featuring for their U18 team at the age of 16.

Club career

Arsenal
Roberts joined Arsenal on 3 June 2010, from Norwich City on scholarship terms. Robert's first season at the club went well as he scored four goals in 15 appearances at the under-18s level for Arsenal. He then followed that up during the 2011–12 season scoring nine goals in only 23 matches for the under-18s and becoming the top scorer among the Arsenal under-18s and he made four appearances for the reserves, scoring 1 goal in the process against Wolverhampton Wanderers. At the start of the 2012–13 season he joined Inverness on loan. Phillips was released by Arsenal at the end of the 2012–13 season.

Inverness CT (loan)
On 30 August 2012, Roberts signed a loan deal with Scottish Premier League side Inverness Caledonian Thistle until January 2013. On 22 September, he made his professional debut for Inverness in the Scottish Premier League against Hibernian coming on as a 71st-minute substitute for Conor Pepper as Inverness drew 2–2. Seven days later, he scored his first professional goal and provided assist for Richie Foran in a 4–0 win over Dundee United. After the match, Roberts says he couldn't ask for more after his performance. On 24 November 2012, Roberts set up a goal for Billy McKay -who scored the only goal in the game – as Inverness beat Celtic 1–0. On 7 December 2012, Roberts loan spell was extended until the end of the season. In the semi-final of Scottish League Cup against Hearts, which was 1–1 draw and led to penalties shoot-out, Roberts missed the vital penalty when he shot and blazed over the bar in front of Inverness fans, allowing Hearts to go to the final. Opposition goalkeeper Jamie MacDonald claims he spooked Roberts, causing him miss the penalty.

Falkirk
Following his release from Arsenal, Roberts went on trial with League Two side, Wycombe Wanderers, scoring two goals in a pre-season friendly at Farnborough before the match was abandoned after the pitch was dangerous to play.

On 26 July 2013, Roberts return to Scotland, again, by joining Scottish Championship side Falkirk after playing as a trialist. Roberts joined Manager Gary Holt, who knew him from his time at Norwich City and signed a two-year contract, subjected to international clearance. The next day, on 27 July 2013, Roberts made his Falkirk's debut, in the first round of the Ramsdens Cup, in a 2–1 win over Clyde. Roberts continued to make an impressive display with the club, including scoring a hat-trick in a 3–0 win over Livingston on 24 August 2013. Since then, Roberts struggled to make a goal-scoring form, having been overshadowed by his striking partner, Rory Loy.

On 23 March 2014, Roberts was sent off in a game against Alloa Athletic, a game in which Falkirk lost 3–0. Roberts was involved in an incident with Alloa's Michael Doyle, which led to Roberts' sending off. As a result of his sending off, Roberts was given a six match ban and this would lead the club making an "investigation the manner in line with its disciplinary procedures". This was to be his last appearance in a Falkirk shirt, and his contract was cancelled by mutual consent.

As a result of the incident, Roberts and Holt had a falling out, with Holt making criticism towards Roberts by describing his behavior as "cowardly". Roberts responded his comment as "harsh".

Dundee
Dundee, who had been promoted to the Scottish Premiership, signed Roberts on 8 May 2014. After the move, Roberts says joining the club was an easy decision to make following discussions with manager Paul Hartley. He made his debut on 26 August 2014, as Dundee beat Raith Rovers 4–0 in the Scottish League Cup. Having served four league matches at the start of the season, Roberts made his Dundee debut, where he provided an assist for James McPake, in a 1–1 draw against Celtic on 31 August 2014.

On 2 February 2015, Roberts moved on loan to Scottish Championship side Alloa Athletic until the end of the 2014–15 season. Roberts made his Alloa Athletic debut on 14 February 2015, where he made his first start, in a 1–0 loss against Queen of the South. After making seven appearances for the club, his loan spell at Alloa Athletic came to an end in early-May.

On 28 August 2015, Roberts was informed by Paul Hartley that he was no longer part of the club's plans, with his contract being terminated by mutual consent the same day.

Sligo Rovers
On 22 February 2016, Roberts signed for Sligo Rovers in the League of Ireland Premier Division.

Return to England
On 11 January 2017, Roberts returned to England, signing for non-league club Chelmsford City. On 22 February 2017, after failing to break through into Chelmsford's first team, Roberts was loaned to Chesham United. Roberts signed for rivals Braintree Town ahead of the 2017–18 season. In February 2018, after scoring 17 league goals for Braintree, Roberts returned to Chelmsford, scoring one goal in six league appearances in his second spell at the club.

The following season, Roberts signed for Hemel Hempstead Town, before signing for Dartford. In April 2019, Dartford confirmed the departure of Roberts, after eight goals in 17 appearances, after failing to turn up for Dartford's eventual 3–1 defeat to Weston-super-Mare. In August 2019, Roberts signed for Wealdstone. On 12 January 2020, following short spells with Hayes & Yeading United and Romford, Roberts signed for Welling United.

On 2 October 2020, after a short spell with Brentwood Town, Roberts returned to Chelmsford for a third spell at the club. On 12 February 2021, Chelmsford manager Robbie Simpson confirmed Roberts' departure from the club.

In August 2021, Roberts signed for Isthmian League North Division side Tilbury.

International career
Roberts is eligible to play for the Republic of Ireland through his parents as well as England and Jamaica. Roberts made his Republic of Ireland U17 debut against the Czech Republic U17s in 2009, coming on with the score 1–1 before giving the Republic of Ireland the lead.

Career statistics

References

1994 births
Living people
Footballers from the London Borough of Newham
Republic of Ireland association footballers
Republic of Ireland under-21 international footballers
Republic of Ireland youth international footballers
English footballers
Norwich City F.C. players
Arsenal F.C. players
Inverness Caledonian Thistle F.C. players
Scottish Premier League players
Falkirk F.C. players
Dundee F.C. players
Alloa Athletic F.C. players
Sligo Rovers F.C. players
Chelmsford City F.C. players
Chesham United F.C. players
Braintree Town F.C. players
Hemel Hempstead Town F.C. players
Dartford F.C. players
Wealdstone F.C. players
Hayes & Yeading United F.C. players
Romford F.C. players
Welling United F.C. players
Brentwood Town F.C. players
Tilbury F.C. players
League of Ireland players
Scottish Professional Football League players
National League (English football) players
Southern Football League players
Isthmian League players
Association football forwards